James Pollard (1792–1867) was a British painter noted for his mail coach, fox hunting and equine scenes.

Life
Pollard was born in Baynes Spa Fields (later renamed Exmouth Street) in Islington, the son of the painter and publisher Robert Pollard (1755–1838).

Between 1821 and 1839, James Pollard exhibited at the Royal Academy. He exhibited at the British Institution in 1824 and 1844. During his career, he also worked with John Frederick Herring Sr. on several horse racing paintings in which he painted the backgrounds and spectators while Herring painted the horses.

Many of his compositions were published as aquatints, although, unlike his father, he engraved only a few plates himself.

James Pollard died in Chelsea in 1867.

References

External links
 James Pollard biography at Artnet.com
 James Pollard at Tate Britain

British Realist painters
Equine artists
People from Islington (district)
1792 births
1867 deaths